Daryl Kerrigan, known professionally as Daryl K (born 2 April) is an Irish born, fashion designer based in New York City

Early life
Kerrigan was born in Dublin. Inspired by her mother's fashion sense and dressmaking abilities, Kerrigan enrolled at the National College of Art and Design in Dublin. When she was 22 years old, Kerrigan moved to New York City.

Her first years in New York were spent working in film, where she worked as a costume designer and on-set wardrobe supervisor for independent features such as Jim Jarmusch's Mystery Train and My Cousin Vinny starring Marisa Tomei.

She is partnered with  Paul Leonard, also from Dublin;  the couple has two children.

Career
With no prior experience working in the fashion industry, in 1991, with savings, she opened her first shop in the East Village, on Sixth Street. Purely through word of mouth from musicians, performers and style hunters, it was  time for the fashion crowd to discover her.

She immediately developed the Hip Hugger Bootleg Jean, which drew people like Sonic Youth front woman Kim Gordon, as well as fashion editors like Camilla Nickerson and stylists to the store and earned Daryl cult status in fashion circles. Her boot-cut hipster jeans, dubbed "low riders" were  inspired by a pair of red velvet 70's hiphuggers. These jeans were to make her name and become the mainstay of her collections.

In 1997, Kerrigan opened a store on 21 Bond Street in William Wegman's former studio. Bond Street has since been home to her flagship store.

Kerrigan suffered some setback after her labels ("Daryl K" and "K-189") were acquired by the Leiber Group in 2000.  After just  a year, her stores in Los Angeles and New York closed after the Leiber Group halted production. In 2002, she fought to get back the rights to her labels and  re- launched the brands in October 2002 in the same Bond Street store that had been closed in 2001. 
She soon was back on her feet again as her loyal customers began to return to the store, mostly by word-of -mouth. Shortly after, as the Daryl K line began to sell out in Barneys New York and other locations, Daryl  and The Barneys Team  launched the Daryl K-189 /Co-Op collection together.

Her vision was evident in the shows which were legendary in fashion lore: An empty swimming pool in the LES; the space now known as "Capitale" when it was a working bank; the roof of Gordon Bunshaft's Lever House; on top of a flatbed truck, in the Gagosian Gallery on 21st Street when it was a parking garage – Joey Ramone attended this show as Ramones tracks played back to back for the entire runway show.

Daryl has been a consultant to companies including Calvin Kelin, The Gap, The Limited, and Tommy Hilfiger.

In March 2012, Daryl closed the store on Bond Street. The Daryl K collection continues to sell  through the Daryl K website and various retailers.
The Daryl K stretch Leather leggings are worn faithfully by gallery girls, artists, editors and models. They have been a staple in the closet of Olivia Palermo for almost ten years.

Since 2012,  Daryl K has created collaborative collections for  companies including Urban Outfitters, Steven Alan, Madewell, Calvin Klein, CK Jeans and Beauty.com.

References

External links
 
 
 
 
 Daryl Kerrigan index at the New York Times

1964 births
Living people
Irish fashion designers
Alumni of the National College of Art and Design
Irish expatriates in the United States
Irish costume designers
Irish women fashion designers